Frater is the Latin word for brother. 

In Roman Catholicism, a monk who is not a priest

Frater may also refer to:

People

Surname
 Alexander Frater (1937–2020), New Hebrides travel writer and journalist
 Anne Frater, Scottish poet from Bayble, Outer Hebrides
 Benjamin Frater (1979–2007), Australian poet
 George Frater, Scottish rugby player active 1896–1905
 György Fráter (1482–1551), Croatian nobleman and monk
 Kevaughn Frater (born 1994), Jamaican footballer
 Lindel Frater (born 1977), Jamaican sprinter
 Lóránd Fráter, (1872-1930), Hungarian composer
 Michael Frater (born 1982), Jamaican sprinter
 Rhiannon Frater, American author
 Robert Frater (cricketer) (1902–1968), New Zealand cricketer
 Robert Frater (fencer) (born 1887), British Olympic fencer
 Tony Van Frater (died 2015), guitarist for British band Red Alert
 Viktoria Frater, Hungarian gymnast

Title
 Frater Achad (Charles Stansfeld Jones; 1886–1950), English occultist 
 Frater Albertus (1911–1984), American alchemist and teacher
 Frater Eratus (Karl Spiesberger; 1904–1992), German mystic and occultist
 Frater Perdurabo (Aleister Crowley; 1875–1947), English occultist
 Frater Progradior (Frank Bennett (occultist); 1868–1930), Australian occultist
 Frater Saturnus (Karl Germer; 1885–1962), German occultist
 Frater U.: D.: (Ralph Tegtmeier; born 1952), German occultist

Other
 Frater House, a house where fraternity or sorority members live and work together
 Frater, Ontario, a community in the Unorganized North Algoma District, Ontario, Canada 
 Refectory, sometimes called a frater, a dining hall in a monastery or boarding school
 The Frater, publication of Psi Omega, an American fraternity of dentists
 Frater Superior, the head of Ordo Templi Orientis, an international fraternal and religious organization
 Frater (lingua sistemfrater), a constructed language

See also
 Frater Arvale, a body of priests in ancient Roman religion
 Frater Polonorum or Polish Brethren, members of the Minor Reformed Church of Poland, 1565–1658. 
 Frater Rosae Crucis, a title in the Rosicrucian organization Ancient Mystical Order Rosæ Crucis
 Fráter–Seebach alkylation, an organic chemical reaction
 Fraternal (disambiguation)
 Brother (disambiguation)